Esquirol means scab (strikebreaker) in Spanish, and squirrel in Catalan and Occitan. It is also a surname and may refer to:

 Jean-Étienne Dominique Esquirol (1772–1840), French psychiatrist
 John H. Esquirol (1900–1970), American Episcopal bishop
 Joseph A. Esquirol (1898–1981), New York politician

See also
 Charenton (asylum), commonly referred to as the "Esquirol Hospital"

Catalan-language surnames